Star Hunter is a 1995 science fiction film directed by Cole S. McKay and Fred Olen Ray, and starring Roddy McDowall and Stella Stevens. The eponymous character is an alien who travels through space seeking species to hunt for pleasure. He arrives on Earth, landing in Los Angeles, and is soon in pursuit of a teacher and her students, whose bus broke down on the way home from a football game.

Plot

Two aliens escape from prison and begin traveling throughout the galaxy, hunting species on different planets for fun. The hunters set up on Earth, and begin terrorizing a group of high school students whose bus has broken down after a school football game. The aliens set up a force field around the area to prevent the teens and their chaperone (Stella Stevens) from receiving any outside aid.

The students seek safety in the house of a blind man (Roddy McDowall), who, unknown to them, is actually one of the hunters. The aliens force the teens to fight a robot, named Star Hunter. The students improvise weapons, but these prove ineffective against Star Hunter.

Officers from the alien prison arrive; known as trackers, they are in pursuit of the escapees. They attempt to help the teens. One tracker takes control of a student, but the alien is hindered by his unfamiliarity with human emotions.

Cast

Production

Fred Olen Ray reshot half an hour of the film for $11,000.

Stella Stevens was proud of having worked with Roddy McDowall.

Reception

This movie has no score on Rotten Tomatoes. It also received one star from Creature Feature, which liked the movie’s premise, but called its execution hokey and amateurish. Moria gave the movie a rating of zero.

Home release

As of November 2020, the movie as available on Amazon Prime.

References

External links
 
 

1998 science fiction films
1998 films
Films about death games
Films set in Los Angeles
Films directed by Fred Olen Ray
1990s English-language films